Panther Branch is a stream in Hickman County, Tennessee, in the United States. It is a tributary of the Duck River.

Panther Creek was so named on account of numerous panthers who preyed on area livestock and wildlife.

See also
List of rivers of Tennessee

References

Rivers of Hickman County, Tennessee
Rivers of Tennessee